The 1968 Cronulla-Sutherland Sharks season was the 2nd in the club's history. They competed in the NSWRFL's 1968 season.

Ladder

References

Cronulla-Sutherland Sharks seasons
Cronulla-Sutherland Sharks season